HBO Max is an over-the-top subscription service owned and operated by Warner Bros. Discovery and run through Warner Bros. Entertainment. It distributes a number of original shows, including original series, specials, miniseries, and documentaries and films. The shows produced for HBO Max are dubbed "Max Originals". Max Originals are specifically made for audiences outside the traditional baseline HBO brand, while simultaneously working in parity with the HBO library. Content that is based on new and existing properties from WarnerMedia's subsidiaries will be distributed through HBO Max. Prior to the COVID-19 pandemic, HBO Max was scheduled to release 31 original series in 2020, with plans to grow to 50 series in 2021.

Original programming

Drama

Comedy

Kids & family

Animation

Adult animation

Kids & family

Non-English language scripted

Unscripted

Docuseries

Reality

Variety

Co-productions 
These are productions that HBO Max co-produced and aired shortly after the show's initial premiere on its parent network.

Continuations 
These shows have been picked up by HBO Max for additional seasons after having aired previous seasons on another network.

Specials 
These programs are one-time original events or supplementary content related to television shows.

Regional original programming 
These shows are originals because HBO Max commissioned or acquired them and had their premiere on the service, but they are not available worldwide.

Original podcasts

Scripted

Upcoming original programming 
These shows have had their original production or additional seasons commissioned by HBO Max.

Drama

Comedy

Kids & family

Animation

Adult animation

Kids & family

Non-English language scripted

Unscripted

Docuseries

Reality

Variety

Co-productions

Continuations

In development

Notes

References 

Internet-related lists
HBO Max
 
Warner Bros. Discovery-related lists